Demir Hisar, also known as Železnik, is an area spreading on the South West part of Macedonia to the North West of the Pelagonian plain, around the river flow of the Crna River with her inflows. The greater parts of the surrounding area of Demir Hisar are smaller hills and mountains, and a small part which is spread around the mentioned river is low lands. A signature of this area are the mountains Bigla, Ilinska and Plakenska, on which is the highest peak reaching 2000 m which separates the region of Demir Hisar with the lake regions of Prespa and Ohrid.

Name
The name of Demir Hisar derives from the treasure of iron which the surrounding mountains in this region have, which is why it is called Iron Fortress. The name has been changed according to the ruler and his ruling period. When it was ruled by the Ottoman army, the name was changed into "Demir Hisar" which in their language also means "Iron Fortress". "Demir Hisar" was maintained as the town's name when in Yugoslavia, and remained so in Macedonia.

Population

The community of Demir Hisar comprises 10,610 inhabitants, 0.53% of the population of Macedonia, and 21% of them live in the town Demir Hisar. The town is spread over 473 km² and it is accounted that nearly 23.6 people live per square kilometre. With the new structure of the territory of the Republic of Macedonia, the municipality of Sopotnica was integrated into Demir Hisar municipality. Today the municipality of Demir Hisar is spread over a territory of 473 km². As part of this municipality, 41 inhabited places are included, from which the central part is the town Demir hisar with a population of 2,447.

History

The community started developing somewhere in 1945 soon after the end of the Second World War. First in Demir Hisar was formed a political – social administrative community – Local public administration, and it was placed in the village of Lopatica.

Demir Hisar as a  community is an independent society which is in constant progress, and now is a well-developed and well-known place in the Republic, with their own systems for water, electricity, garbage disposal systems and extensive roads that lead to neighbouring communities.

Culture

Folk ensemble "Ilinden" works in the Cultural Educational Centre. It has a small, middle, and big group, own orchestra with a total of 150 members. The ensemble was formed in 1993. With it work three choreographers as external collaborators of the CEC. At repertoire of folk ensemble there are 10 choreographies which are presented afore citizens of Demir Hisar, in neighborhood municipalities and wide in Macedonia and abroad (Serbia and Montenegro, Bulgaria and Austria). In these places ensemble "Ilinden" has received widespread recognition and awards.

Mention must be made of participation in festivals like "Ilindenski Denovi" Bitola, "Injevo" -Radovis, "10 days Krusevo Republic" - Krusevo, days of Cultural Educational Centres of Macedonia, etc.
 
Guests of ensemble "Ilinden" have been many ensembles from many countries like, "Ograzdence" - Petric (Bulgaria), "Nisan" - Sandanski (Bulgaria), "Kapance" - Razgrad (Bulgaria), "Tanasko Rajic" - Cacak (Serbia and Montenegro), "Stubline" -Obrenovac (Serbia and Montenegro) and "Floricanka" - Razin (Moldavia).
Cultural Educational Centre "Ilinden" - Demir Hisar, with Folk Ensemble up to now have great cooperation with other Cultural Educational Centers in Macedonia, and that cooperation brings many collective concerts (with Krusevo, Makedonski Brod, Demir Kapija) and concerts with ensembles "Ilinden" - Bitola, and "Vlado Tasevski" - Skopje.

Ilinden plans many new visits for the future in Macedonia as well as abroad.

External links
http://www.demirhisar.gov.mk

Geography of North Macedonia